Marguerite Jeanne "Meg" Japy Steinheil, Baroness Abinger (16 April 1869 – 17 July 1954) was a French woman known for her many love affairs with important men. She was present at the death of President Félix Faure, who was rumored to have died after having a seizure while allegedly having sex with her. She was later tried for the murders of her husband and mother, but was acquitted.

Early life
Steinheil was born Marguerite Jeanne Japy in Beaucourt, in the Territoire de Belfort, to a rich, industrial family, the daughter of Émilie (Rau) and Édouard Japy. She married the French painter Adolphe Steinheil, son of painter Louis Charles Auguste Steinheil, in July 1890. She became a prominent figure in Parisian society, and her salon was frequented by men of eminence in French political and social circles, including Charles Gounod, Ferdinand de Lesseps, René Lalique, Jules Massenet, François Coppée, Émile Zola, and Pierre Loti.

Mistress of President Félix Faure
In 1897, she was introduced, at Chamonix, to President Félix Faure, who was giving an official contract to Adolphe Steinheil.

On 16 February 1899, Félix Faure called Marguerite by telephone, asking her to come to the palace at the end of the afternoon.  Briefly after her arrival, servants were rung for and they found the president lying on the couch while Marguerite Steinheil adjusted her disordered clothing. Faure died several hours later.

Unverified legend has it that she was performing oral sex on him when he suffered a fatal stroke, his convulsed hands tangled in her hair. This was not officially announced, but rumours started spreading immediately, although for several years it was believed that his partner at the time of his death was actress Cécile Sorel.

After the death of Félix Faure, Marguerite Steinheil became the mistress of many famous men.

In her , she records how she and her spouse received a mysterious German guest, who bought back from them each of the pearls of a collar given to her by Faure (as it became known in the press) and who reclaimed a manuscript of the president's memoirs which he had entrusted to Marguerite.

In February 1908, she met the powerful industrialist Maurice Borderel, also from the Ardennes, and soon became his lover.

Both had died of suffocation by strangulation. Marguerite was found gagged and bound to a bed. She initially said that she had been tied up by four black-robed strangers, three men and a woman. Some newspapers speculated that they had come to her house in search of secret documents which Faure had entrusted to her keeping, possibly relating to the Dreyfus affair.

The police immediately regarded her as a suspect in the killings but had no hard evidence and made a pretence of abandoning the investigation. But Steinheil herself would not let the affair rest.  She made an attempt to frame her manservant, Rémy Couillard, by concealing a small pearl which she affirmed had been stolen at the time of the murder in a pocketbook belonging to Couillard; after that fabrication was discovered, she blamed Alexandre Wolff, the son of her old housekeeper, but he was able to establish an alibi.  She was arrested in November 1908 and taken to Saint-Lazare Prison.  The crime created a sensation in Paris. It was revealed that she had had a great number of admirers, including even King Sisowath of Cambodia. Opponents of the government tried to make political capital of the affair, the anti-Semitic  even charging her with having poisoned President Faure. A sensational trial finally ended in her acquittal on 14 November 1909, although the judge called her stories "tissues of lies".

Later life
After the trial she moved to London, where she was known as Mme de Serignac. She wrote My Memoirs in 1912. On 26 June 1917, she married Robert Scarlett, 6th Baron Abinger, who died in 1927. She lived at 24 Adelaide Crescent in Hove from that year and died in a nursing home in the town.

In popular culture 

Steinheil is a character in the French TV drama, Paris Police 1900, which premiered in 2021 on Canal+ in France and BBC Four in the UK. She is played by Evelyne Brochu. The French television film The President's Mistress" (La maîtresse du président, 2009) is a dramatized version of these events.

References

Sources
Alain Decaux : Les assassins, Perrin.
Armand Lanoux : Madame Steinheil ou la Connaissance du président (1983).
Christian Siméon, dramaturge : La Priapée des Écrevisses ou l’Affaire Steinheil.
Pierre Darmon, historien : Marguerite Steinheil, ingénue criminelle? (Perrin, 1996).
Jacques Neirynck : Le crime du prince de Galles, (2007)

External links

Footage of Marguerite Steinheil's wedding to 6th Baron Abinger in 1917

 
 
 New York Tribune; Sunday April 28, 1912 "Memoirs of Fascinating Mme. Steinheil Abound in Mystery and Adventure"

1869 births
1954 deaths
French expatriates in the United Kingdom
French memoirists
French salon-holders
Mistresses
People from the Territoire de Belfort
People of the French Third Republic
French women memoirists
Abinger
People acquitted of murder
20th-century French women writers
20th-century memoirists